The 1937 Soviet Top League was the third season of the Soviet Top League.

Format
This year it was decided to have both season halves combined. After playing two games in the Group B it was decided to return CDKA Moscow back to the Group A. The Group A was extended once again to nine teams with a new team FC Metallurg Moscow joining the group that won the 1936 Group B fall championship. At the end of the season no teams were relegated as the group was planned to be extended for the next season. The season started in the summer after the cup competition that preceded it and was also won by Dynamo Moscow.

The defending champion for this edition was FC Spartak Moscow. The season started somewhat late on July 23, 1937, with the game in Kyiv where the League newcomer Metallurg surprisingly defeated the local Dynamo 2:0. The conclusion of the season came on October 30, 1937, with the games in Tbilisi and Moscow's Sokolniki. That game on CSKA Stadium became a culminating as the Army team hold the defending champions to a draw that left Spartak without their title. Interesting is the fact that less than a week prior to that Dynamo Moscow was able to defeat CDKA 5:1 setting them three points ahead of Spartak.

Standings

Results

Top scorers

Medal squads
(league appearances and goals listed in brackets)

References

 Soviet Union - List of final tables (RSSSF)

Soviet Top League seasons
1
Soviet
Soviet